Doig may refer to:

Places
Doig, Alberta, Canada, an unincorporated community
Doig Airport, a remote forest fire suppression airfield in northwestern Alberta, Canada
Doig River, a river in Alberta and northern British Columbia, Canada

People
Doig (surname)

Other uses
Doig Formation, a stratigraphical unit of middle Triassic age in the Western Canadian Sedimentary Basin
Doig Medal, an award for the Fremantle Football Club in the Australian Football League